Álvaro Antón Camarero (born 28 December 1983) is a Spanish former professional footballer who played as a midfielder.

He played 305 Segunda División games over 11 seasons, representing six clubs and scoring 41 goals. In La Liga, he appeared for Valladolid and Numancia (a total of eight matches).

Club career
Born in Pinilla de los Barruecos, Province of Burgos, Antón grew in the ranks of Real Valladolid and, after having appeared in the closing round of 2002–03's La Liga, a 1–1 away draw against Deportivo Alavés, he played three Segunda División seasons with the main squad. In the 2006–07 campaign, he contributed 21 games and two goals (including one in a 1–0 win at Málaga CF) as the Castile and León team returned to the top division after a three-year absence.

Antón was absent throughout the first half of 2007–08, only appearing in Copa del Rey matches. He was loaned in January 2008 to Racing de Ferrol, eventually relegated to the Segunda División B.

Antón was loaned again in the 2008–09 season, now to promoted CD Numancia. He played his first game for the Soria side on 31 August 2008, coming on as a second-half substitute in a 1–0 home victory over FC Barcelona. In November, during a home defeat against Real Betis, he suffered a serious anterior cruciate ligament injury, being lost for the rest of the campaign – his #21 jersey was given to new signing Carlos Aranda.

In late August 2009, Antón moved again on loan, joining Recreativo de Huelva for 2009–10's second division and experiencing his best season as a professional, scoring five goals in 2,689 minutes for the Andalusians. On 27 July 2012, after being relegated from the second tier with FC Cartagena, he joined fellow league club CD Guadalajara on a one-year contract, and suffered the same fate at the end of the season due administratives issues.

Antón subsequently returned to Recreativo, and was released in June 2015 following yet another relegation from division two. On 1 August, he went back to his native region and signed with SD Ponferradina.

On 31 August 2016, following his team's relegation, the 32-year-old Antón returned to his native region and joined Burgos CF for two years. A year later, he moved to CD Toledo also in the third tier, and remained with them after their relegation to the Tercera División in 2018.

References

External links

1983 births
Living people
Sportspeople from the Province of Burgos
Spanish footballers
Footballers from Castile and León
Association football midfielders
La Liga players
Segunda División players
Segunda División B players
Tercera División players
Real Valladolid Promesas players
Real Valladolid players
Racing de Ferrol footballers
CD Numancia players
Recreativo de Huelva players
FC Cartagena footballers
CD Guadalajara (Spain) footballers
SD Ponferradina players
Burgos CF footballers
CD Toledo players